In computer science, read–modify–write is a class of atomic operations (such as test-and-set, fetch-and-add, and compare-and-swap) that both read a memory location and write a new value into it simultaneously, either with a completely new value or some function of the previous value.  These operations prevent race conditions in multi-threaded applications. Typically they are used to implement mutexes or semaphores.  These atomic operations are also heavily used in non-blocking synchronization.

Maurice Herlihy (1991) ranks atomic operations by their consensus numbers, as follows:

 : memory-to-memory move and swap, augmented queue, compare-and-swap, fetch-and-cons, sticky byte, load-link/store-conditional (LL/SC)
 : -register assignment
 : test-and-set, swap, fetch-and-add, queue, stack
 : atomic read and atomic write

It is impossible to implement an operation that requires a given consensus number with only operations with a lower consensus number, no matter how many of such operations one uses.  Read–modify–write instructions often produce unexpected results when used on I/O devices, as a write operation may not affect the same internal register that would be accessed in a read operation.

This term is also associated with RAID levels that perform actual write operations as atomic read–modify–write sequences.  Such RAID levels include RAID 4, RAID 5 and RAID 6.

See also 

 Linearizability
 Read–erase–modify–write

References 

Concurrency control
Computer memory